George Washington Johnson may refer to:

George W. Johnson (singer), singer and early recording artist
George W. Johnson (governor), Kentucky politician and US Civil War figure

See also
George Johnson (disambiguation)